The Advance Stakes was an American Thoroughbred horse race run annually from 1899 through 1910 at the Sheepshead Bay Race Track in Brooklyn, New York. An important race open to horses age three and older, it was raced on dirt. The final running took place on June 27, 1910 and was won by Ballot for the second time.

Historical notes 
A race which regularly attracted many of the best horses of the day, it was won by such stars as future Hall of Fame inductees Imp and Peter Pan, the 1902 Champion Gold Heels, the 1903 Champion Africander whose six top wins that year included the Belmont Stakes, Suburban Handicap, Saratoga Cup, Lawrence Realization Stakes, and the winner of the 1905 Kentucky Derby and Tennessee Derby Agile.

In 1904, Irish Lad set a world record for a mile and three furlongs on dirt in winning the Advance Stakes and in 1908 Ballot set a new world record for a mile and five sixteenths on dirt.

The End of a Race and of a Racetrack
On June 11, 1908, the Republican controlled New York Legislature under Governor Charles Evans Hughes passed the Hart–Agnew anti-betting legislation. The owners of Sheepshead Bay Race Track, and other racing facilities in New York State, struggled to stay in business without income from betting. Racetrack operators had no choice but to drastically reduce the purse money being paid out which resulted in the Advance Stakes offering a purse in 1909 that was less than one-fifth of what it had been in earlier years. These small purses made horse racing unprofitable and impossible for even the most successful horse owners to continue in business.

In spite of strong opposition by prominent owners such as August Belmont Jr. and Harry Payne Whitney, reform legislators were not happy when they learned that betting was still going on at racetracks between individuals and they had further restrictive legislation passed by the New York Legislature in 1910. The Agnew–Perkins Law, a series of four bills and recorded as the Executive Liability Act, made it possible for racetrack owners and members of its board of directors to be fined and imprisoned if anyone was found betting, even privately, anywhere on their premises.  After a 1911 amendment to the law that would limit the liability of owners and directors was defeated in the Legislature, every racetrack in New York State shut down. As a result, the Advance Stakes was not run in 1911 and 1912.

Owners, whose horses of racing age had nowhere to go, began sending them, their trainers and their jockeys to race in England and France. Many horses ended their racing careers there and a number remained to become an important part of the European horse breeding industry. Thoroughbred Times reported that  more than 1,500 American horses were sent overseas between 1908 and 1913 and of them at least 24 were either past, present, or future Champions. A February 21, 1913 ruling by the New York Supreme Court, Appellate Division saw horse racing return in 1913. However, it was too late for the Sheepshead Bay horse racing facility and it never reopened.

Records
Most wins:
 Ballot (1908, 1910)

Most wins by a jockey:
 3 – George Odom (1900, 1902, 1903)
 3 – Joe Notter (1907, 1908, 1910)

Most wins by a trainer:
 3 – James G. Rowe, Sr. (1907, 1908, 1910)

Most wins by an owner:
 3 – James R. Keene (1907, 1908, 1910)

Winners

References

Discontinued horse races in New York City
Sheepshead Bay Race Track
Recurring sporting events established in 1899
Recurring sporting events disestablished in 1910
1899 establishments in New York City
1910 disestablishments in New York (state)